Sammy Kibet Rotich (born 1980) is a male long-distance runner from Kenya.

Achievements

References

External links
Profile at Marathoninfo

1980 births
Living people
Kenyan male long-distance runners
Kenyan male marathon runners